Tobias Francis McCool (October 27, 1918 – May 20, 1973) was a Canadian professional ice hockey goaltender who played for the Toronto Maple Leafs in the National Hockey League. He was born in Calgary, Alberta.

Playing career
McCool played minor hockey in his hometown of Calgary with the Calgary Bronks of the Alberta Senior Hockey League. In 1937–38, McCool played in the Memorial Cup with the Calgary Canadians. In 1939–40, he enrolled at Gonzaga University and played hockey there from 1940 to 1942. In 1942–43, McCool enrolled in the army. He played for one season for the Calgary Currie Army before being discharged as medically unfit to serve.

After returning in 1944–45, he signed a free agent contract with the Toronto Maple Leafs. He was the top goaltender for the Leafs as he led them through the season and all the way to the Stanley Cup. The Leafs beat the Detroit Red Wings in seven games and McCool set a franchise record for most shutouts in the postseason. He also set a NHL record for most consecutive shutouts in the postseason with three, a record that has been tied but not beaten to this day. He also held another Stanley Cup record for the fewest goals allowed in the Final with nine.  This stood until the 2011 Stanley Cup Finals, when it was beaten by Boston Bruins netminder Tim Thomas.  McCool also set another milestone as he became the first NHL goaltender to record an assist. At the end of the season, McCool was the recipient of the Calder Memorial Trophy.

After just playing in 22 games in 1945–46, he retired after just two years because of severe ulcers. After his retirement, he became an assistant publisher and general manager for the Calgary Albertan. He suffered from ulcers during his career, and it was confirmed that ulcers played a part in his death on May 20, 1973.

Legacy
Frank McCool has an arena named after him in the southeast community of Lake Bonavista in the city where he was born, Calgary, Alberta.

Awards and achievements
Calder Memorial Trophy winner in 1945.
Stanley Cup champion in 1945.
Shares NHL record for most consecutive shutouts in the postseason (3).
Hold Toronto Maple Leafs record for most shutouts in the postseason (4).

Career statistics

Regular season and playoffs

References

External links

Picture of Frank McCool's Name on the 1945 Stanley Cup Plaque

1918 births
1973 deaths
Calder Trophy winners
Canadian ice hockey goaltenders
Canadian military personnel of World War II
Canadian people of Irish descent
Deaths from ulcers
Gonzaga University alumni
Ice hockey people from Calgary
Stanley Cup champions
Gonzaga Bulldogs men's ice hockey players
Toronto Maple Leafs players